Paltsevo may refer to:

Paltsevo, Kursk Oblast, a village (selo) in Kursk Oblast, Russia
Paltsevo, Leningrad Oblast, a rural locality in Leningrad Oblast, Russia